Chungenesh (also Romanized as Chūngenesh; also known as Chaqūnganesh, Choqūngonash, Chūngūnesh, and Showngūnesh) is a village in Ojarud-e Gharbi Rural District, in the Central District of Germi County, Ardabil Province, Iran. At the 2006 census, its population was 148, in 25 families.

References 

Towns and villages in Germi County